The 2006–07 Czech First League, known as the Gambrinus liga for sponsorship reasons, was the fourteenth season of Czech Republic's top-tier of football.

Teams

Stadia and locations

Managerial changes

League table

Results

Top goalscorers

See also
 2006–07 Czech Cup
 2006–07 Czech 2. Liga

References 

 Statistics of the 2006-2007 season at iDNES.cz

Czech First League seasons
Czech
1